Tachyrhynchus reticulatus is a species of sea snail, a marine gastropod mollusk in the family Turritellidae.

Distribution

Description 
The maximum recorded shell length is 24.8 mm.

Habitat 
Minimum recorded depth is 3 m. Maximum recorded depth is 2277 m.

References

Turritellidae
Gastropods described in 1842